The 2001–02 season was the 65th season in the existence of Nîmes Olympique and the club's third consecutive season in the second division of French football. In addition to the domestic league, Nîmes Olympique competed in this season's edition of the Coupe de France and Coupe de la Ligue. The season covered the period from 1 July 2001 to 30 June 2002.

Players

First-team squad

Transfers

In

Out

Pre-season and friendlies

Competitions

Overall record

French Division 2

League table

Results summary

Results by round

Matches

Coupe de France

Coupe de la Ligue

References 

Nîmes Olympique seasons
Nîmes Olympique